The Third Commonwealth Paraplegic Games was a multi-sport event that was held in Edinburgh, Scotland from 26 July to 1 August 1970. Dubbed the "little games", they followed the 1970 British Commonwealth Games which were held in Edinburgh from 16 to 25 July of that year.

Background and administration
The chairman of the Organising Committee was Lieutenant-Colonel John Fraser. It was also known as the "little games" and the "Wheelchair Games".

Ceremonies
The Games were opened by the British Prime Minister Edward Heath. The opening ceremony was at Meadowbank stadium and was attended by a crowd of 2,000 people. The teams were led in by the hosts of the previous games, Jamaica. On behalf of all the competitors, James Laird, the Scottish team captain, took an oath. A message of support from the Provosts of 28 towns and cities across Scotland was read out, having been relayed from John o' Groats by runners from the Scottish Youth Clubs Association.

The games were closed by James MacKay, Lord Provost of the Edinburgh Corporation.

Participating teams
197 athletes from fourteen Commonwealth countries took part. Countries at this games that had not previously participated were Hong Kong, India, Malaysia, Malta and Uganda.

Sports 
Sports included:
 
  Archery
 Athletics
 Dartchery
 Lawn Bowls
 Pentathlon (Archery, Athletics and Swimming Events)
 Shooting
 Swimming
 Table Tennis
 Weightlifting (Men Only)
 Wheelchair Basketball (Men Only)
 Wheelchair Fencing

Venues 

The following were the venues for the games:

Logistics 
An athletes' village was located at Turnhouse, with accommodation provided free of charge to the athletes by the Ministry of Defence. The Edinburgh Corporation had supplied fourteen adapted buses, which volunteer drivers used to transport the athletes between venues during the games. Athletics events were held at Meadowbank stadium. Shooting events were held at Redcraigs shooting range in West Lothian. There was some criticism of the lack of day-to-day television coverage from the BBC and ITV broadcasters.

Medal table
The final medal table is:

See also
Commonwealth Games hosted in Scotland:
 1970 Commonwealth Games in Edinburgh
 1986 Commonwealth Games in Edinburgh
 2014 Commonwealth Games in Glasgow

References

Commonwealth Paraplegic Games
Paraplegic Games
Commonwealth Paraplegic Games
Commonwealth Paraplegic Games
Commonwealth Paraplegic Games
Commonwealth Paraplegic Games
Commonwealth Paraplegic Games
International sports competitions in Edinburgh